Talton is a surname. Notable people with the surname include:

Alix Talton (1920–1992), American actress
Brad Talton, American board game designer from Albuquerque, New Mexico
Chester Talton (born 1941), the Provisional Bishop of the Episcopal Diocese of San Joaquin
Gary Talton (born 1990), American basketball player
Irvin Talton, Democrat who served in the Louisiana House of Representatives (1880–1884)
Robert Talton (born 1945), Republican former member of the Texas House of Representatives
Tim Talton (1939–2021), American professional baseball player
Tommy Talton, American guitarist who played with Cowboy, Gregg Allman, and recording sessions
Tyree Talton (born 1976), former American football defensive back in the NFL and the XFL
Willie Talton, Republican member of the Georgia General Assembly till 2015

See also
Talton v. Mayes, 163 U.S. 376 (1896), a United States Supreme Court case that decided that individual rights protections do not apply to tribal government
Talton Higbee Embry (1897–1946), wealthy aviation enthusiast who co-founded the company leading to Embry-Riddle Aeronautical University